The 1995 Toshiba Classic was a women's tennis tournament played on outdoor hard courts at the La Costa Resort and Spa in San Diego, California in the United States that was part of Tier II of the 1995 WTA Tour. It was the 17th edition of the tournament and was held from July 31 through August 6, 1995. Second-seeded Conchita Martínez won the singles title and earned $79,5000 first-prize money.

Finals

Singles

 Conchita Martínez defeated  Lisa Raymond 6–2, 6–0
 It was Martínez's 5th singles title of the year and the 25th of her career.

Doubles

 Gigi Fernández /  Natasha Zvereva defeated  Alexia Dechaume-Balleret /  Sandrine Testud 6–2, 6–1
 It was Fernández's 5th title of the year and the 60th of her career. It was Zvereva's 4th title of the year and the 59th of her career.

References

External links
 ITF tournament edition details
 Tournament draws

Toshiba Classic
Southern California Open
Toshiba Classic
1995 in American tennis